Criminals are people who commit crime.

Criminals or The Criminals may also refer to:

 The Criminals (band), an American punk rock band
 The Criminals (film), a 1962 Australian TV movie
 Criminals (film), a 1975 Indian Malayalam film
 "Criminals" (DMA's song), 2020
 "Criminals", by David Cook from the 2015 album Digital Vein

See also
 Criminal (disambiguation)
 Crime (disambiguation)